The 2016 Chinese Taipei Open Grand Prix Gold, parallel with the 2016 Canada Open Grand Prix, is the eighth/ninth Grand Prix's badminton tournament of the 2016 BWF Grand Prix and Grand Prix Gold. The tournament will be held at the Taipei Arena in Taipei, Chinese Taipei on 28 June – 3 July 2016 and has a total purse of $200,000.

Men's singles

Seeds

  Chen Long (withdrew)
  Lee Chong Wei (withdrew)
  Lin Dan (withdrew)
  Tian Houwei (third round)
  Chou Tien-chen (champion)
  Ng Ka Long (third round)
  Hu Yun (first round)
  Wei Nan (quarterfinal)
  Boonsak Ponsana (third round)
  Wong Wing Ki (quarterfinal)
  Hsu Jen-hao (first round)
  Tanongsak Saensomboonsuk (semifinal)
  Iskandar Zulkarnain Zainuddin (semifinal)
  Sony Dwi Kuncoro (first round)
  Sameer Verma (first round)
  Wang Tzu-wei (second round)

Finals

Top half

Section 1

Section 2

Section 3

Section 4

Bottom half

Section 5

Section 6

Section 7

Section 8

Women's singles

Seeds

  Wang Shixian (final)
  Tai Tzu-ying (champion)
  Sun Yu (quarterfinal)
  He Bingjiao (semifinal)
  Porntip Buranaprasertsuk (first round)
  Busanan Ongbamrungphan (second round)
  Pai Yu-po (second round)
  Nichaon Jindapon (semifinal)

Finals

Top half

Section 1

Section 2

Bottom half

Section 3

Section 4

Men's doubles

Seeds

  Li Junhui / Liu Yuchen (champion)
  Goh V Shem / Tan Wee Kiong (quarterfinal)
  Lee Sheng-mu / Tsai Chia-hsin (semifinal)
  Chen Hung-ling / Wang Chi-lin (final)
  Huang Kaixiang / Zheng Siwei (semifinal)
  Bodin Issara / Nipitphon Puangpuapech (quarterfinal)
  Lee Jhe-huei / Lee Yang (first round)
  Hendra Aprida Gunawan / Markis Kido (first round)

Finals

Top half

Section 1

Section 2

Bottom half

Section 3

Section 4

Women's doubles

Seeds

  Luo Ying / Luo Yu (final)
  Chen Qingchen / Jia Yifan (semifinal)
  Jongkolphan Kititharakul / Rawinda Prajongjai (second round)
  Vivian Hoo Kah Mun / Woon Khe Wei (second round)

Finals

Top half

Section 1

Section 2

Bottom half

Section 3

Section 4

Mixed doubles

Seeds

  Chan Peng Soon / Goh Liu Ying (quarterfinal)
  Lee Chun Hei / Chau Hoi Wah (quarterfinal)
  Bodin Issara / Savitree Amitrapai (first round)
  Ronald Alexander / Melati Daeva Oktaviani (second round)
  Zheng Siwei / Chen Qingchen (champion)
  Huang Kaixiang / Huang Dongping (first round)
  Liao Min-chun / Chen Hsiao-huan (first round)
  Kim Dae-eun / Go Ah-ra (quarterfinal)

Finals

Top half

Section 1

Section 2

Bottom half

Section 3

Section 4

References

Chinese Taipei Open
BWF Grand Prix Gold and Grand Prix
Chinese Taipei Open
Chinese Taipei Open